Gold and the Woman is a 1916 American silent drama film directed by James Vincent and starring Theda Bara. The film is now considered to be lost.

Plot 
Dugald Chandos, an early English settler in America, tries to buy a thousand acres of land known as "The Valley of Shadow," from Chief Duskara, of the Wiconicoes. Duskara refuses to sell the land and hides the land grant in a tree. Chandos and his son murder Duskara and then forge the chief's name to a deed transferring the property to the family. The dying wife of Duskara utters a curse against the Chandos family and its descendants, hoping to inflict blindness on them. Generations later, teenager Hester Gray is the descendant of Dugauld, and the heir to "The Valley of Shadow." Lee Duskara, a Harvard student, is the great-great-grandson of the Native American chief. Hester and Lee fall in love. Lee asks Colonel Ernest Dent, Hester's guardian, for permission to marry her. Dent, who was a friend of Hester's father, has become involved with Juliet Cordova, a Mexican adventuress who is serving as his secretary. Juliet holds much influence over Dent and he consults her on even the most trivial of matters. When Juliet learns that Lee plans to marry Hester, she seeks to prevent the marriage. Appearing innocent, she compromises Lee causing Hester to reject him. Juliet covets the lucrativeness of the coal mines now on "The Valley of Shadow" and convinces Dent to marry Hester, while continuing their affair. She lives with them after they're married, posing as Dent's secretary. Hester is stricken with blindness. At Juliet's persuasion, Dent tries to have Hester deed away her title to "The Valley of Shadow." Hester discovers Dent's affair when groping her way through his study and happening upon Juliet and Dent, asleep, embracing in a chair. She flees the house to commit suicide. Lee Duskara, who has established his title to "The Valley of Shadow", prevents her from carrying out her purpose. Dent dies, a victim of his own self-indulgence. Lee again declares his love for Hester and is this time accepted.

Cast

 Theda Bara as Theresa Decordova
 Alma Hanlon as Hester
 H. Cooper Cliffe as Col. Ernest Dent
 Harry Hilliard as Lee Duskara
 Carleton Macy as Dugald Chandos
 Chief Black Eagle as Chief Duskara
 Julia Hurley as Duuskara's Squaw
 Carter B. Harkness as Leelo Duskara
 Caroline Harris as Undetermined Role
 Ted Griffin as Undetermined Role
 Louis Stern as Undetermined Role
 James Sheehan as Undetermined Role
 Frank Whitson as Montrevor
 Pauline Barry as Ethel
 Hattie Delaro as Nurse
 Howard Missimer as Finlay
 B. Reeves Eason Jr.
 Joseph Hamlsh as Murray
 Frances Ne Moyer as Murray's daughter
 George Walsh as Lee Duskara

See also
List of lost films
1937 Fox vault fire
List of Fox Film films

References

External links

1916 films
1916 drama films
1916 lost films
Silent American drama films
American silent feature films
American black-and-white films
Films directed by James Vincent
Lost American films
Fox Film films
Lost drama films
1910s American films